The men's high jump event at the 1966 European Indoor Games was held on 27 March in Dortmund.

Results

References

High jump at the European Athletics Indoor Championships
High